The Turán tanks were a series of Hungarian medium tanks of World War II. They were produced in two main variants: the original 40M Turán (or Turán I) with a 40 mm gun and later the 41M Turán (or Turán II) with a short-barreled 75 mm gun, improved armour and a new turret. A total of 424 were made. The 40M Turán (Turán I) was originally inspired by and used the technology-based solutions found on the design of the Czechoslovak Škoda T-21 medium tank prototype. The Turán tanks fought on the Eastern Front against the Soviets, and in the defence of Hungary.

A further upgraded prototype variant, the 43M Turán (or Turán III) was also developed and constructed but did not go into mass production. This had a powerful long-barreled 75 mm gun, further improved armour and again had a new turret. Prototypes were manufactured, but work on the project stopped in 1944 when the mass-producing terminated in the country.

History
In December 1937 the Škoda workshops prepared a prototype of a medium tank, the Škoda T-21, based on the earlier successful LT vz. 35 project. Two prototypes were started and designated S-IIc, but their construction was never finished. The S-II-c was to have a better 13.8 liter engine giving 250 hp; this increased the maximum speed to roughly 

After Germany annexed Czechoslovakia, the prototypes were finished under the new designation of T-21, which in turn was a predecessor of a new prototype; the T-22. Two of the latter type were given to Hungary in 1941. The Hungarian engineers decided to replace the original 47 mm gun with a Hungarian-produced 40 mm gun for both economic and military reasons. Military experts stated that the armour penetration of the 47 mm gun was not better than the homemade 40 mm's because the latter had a much higher muzzle velocity. The modifications of the tank gun were carried out by the Škoda factory – they used the original Czech gun cradle and placed the Hungarian made barrel into it. The frontal armour was increased too, the engineers riveted a 20 mm armour plate onto the original 30 mm thick frontal armour for 50 mm in total. The turret armour was also 50 mm; formed from a single armour plate. The Czech machine guns were changed to Hungarian 8 mm Gebauer 34/40.M guns. The overall weight was also increased to over 18 tonnes.

Variants

The Turán was produced in three versions – Turán I, II and III. The Turán I was the original medium tank with the 40 mm gun. The gun, the standard Hungarian light anti-tank gun, could fire the same ammunition as the Bofors 40 mm anti-aircraft gun. The turret was of riveted construction. Between 1941 and 1943 a total of 285 tanks were produced. 

The combat experiences of 1941 made Hungary realize that the 40.M Turán (Turán I) which was at the time still under development and construction would not meet the expectations of modern medium tanks. The General Staff of the Hungarian Army changed the second order of 309 medium tanks to 87 medium and 222 heavy tanks armed with a 75 mm gun. This order was later changed again in 1941 to 55 medium and 254 heavy tanks. The General Staff also declared that the new heavy tank must be constructed from those Turáns already built without changing the engine and the weight of the new tank must be equal or close to the heavy tank. The mentioned heavy tank would become the Turán II.

The prototype of the heavy tank and the new 75 mm gun was ordered from the Institute of Military Technology of the Hungarian Army (HTI) in 1941. The HTI did not have any gun designer nor production departments so they had to choose from an already existing gun and try to modify it. The engineers chose the 18.M field artillery gun – 8 cm Feldkanone M.18 – which had been in service since World War I. The HTI ordered the modification of the gun to be done by the Swedish Bofors company, which willingly accepted.

Both the modifications of the chassis – armour thickening to 50 mm by riveting extra 20 mm armour plates on the frontal armour and lower glacis, changing the driver's hatch from a single door which opened to the right to a two-piece folding door which opened to the front – and the prototype of the new gun and turret were finished in January 1942, the new turret was finished in February 1942. The new 75 mm gun was the first Hungarian tank gun with a horizontal semi-automatic sliding block.

During the installation, the gun cradle cracked and repairs delayed the production of the vehicle even further. On May 6, 1942, all the preparations were done for ground testing, the gun cradle was repaired. The test was successful and the new heavy tank was put into service as the 41.M Turán (also known as Turán II or "Turán 75 short"). The first Turán IIs arrived with the troops in September–October 1943 because the production of gun optics and ammunition were delayed.

By that time the Turán II became obsolete as well, but it was still lethal to T-34 medium tanks within 500 meters, which was still good progress compared to previous Hungarian tank capabilities. According to records from 1944, 129 Turán IIs were issued to combat effective units; factory notes recorded that 182-185 41.M Turán heavy tanks (Turán IIs) were manufactured.

Aside from tank production, the chassis was the basis for the Zrínyi II assault gun. This mounted a 105 mm short gun in the hull and lacked the traversable turret of a tank. A total number of 66-72 Zrínyi IIs were made during the war. The only other vehicles known based on this chassis were the Turán III and the Zrínyi I, both of which used the 7.5 cm 43.M tank gun. Only 
two 7.5 cm 43.M tank guns were manufactured. The 7.5 cm 43.M tank gun was developed from the blueprints of the PaK 40, converted in a Hungarian style. Both vehicles were produced as prototypes only. 
The Turán III's prototype with an actual turret was finished in February 1944. Unlike the frontal armour of the hull which was thickened by riveting two armour plates together, the 75 mm thick armour of the turret was made of only one plate. Ground and shooting tests were carried out after the prototype was completed and the prototype was accepted for mass-production. However, no more 43.M Turáns (a.k.a. Turán III or Turán 75 long), or Zrínyi Is were constructed because of the lack of materials and the fact that after the occupation of Hungary in March 1944, Germany did not allow further tank and gun production, restricting the Hungarian industry to only spare part manufacturing level.

It is not known if the prototypes of the Zrínyi I and Turán III were put into service and the fate of the Turán III and the Zrínyi I is unknown.

In combat

The Turáns were employed by the 1st and 2nd Hungarian Armored Divisions, as well as the 1st Cavalry Division, in 1943 and 1944. They were used in fighting on the Eastern Front against the Soviet Union, and in the defence of Hungary.

A number of Turán tanks were captured after the 1944 Royal Coup by the Kingdom of Romania, along with some Toldis and a Zrínyi assault gun.

Survivors
There is only one known surviving Turán tank. It is a Turán II (41M Turán) on display at the Kubinka Tank Museum in Russia.

See also
Related development

 Turán III – Hungarian medium tank developed from the Turán II
 Zrínyi II – Hungarian assault gun developed from the Turán
 Zrínyi I – Hungarian tank destroyer developed from the Turán
 44M Tas – Hungarian heavy tank developed to replace the Turán series, shared some components

Tanks of comparable role, performance, and era
 ST vz. 39 (V-8-H) – Czechoslovak prototype medium tank competing with Škoda T-21
 Panzer III – German medium tank
 Panzer IV – German medium tank
 T-28 – Soviet medium tank
 T-34 – Soviet medium tank
 R-3 – Romanian project, also based on the Škoda T-21

Notes

References 

 
 
 
 
 

Tanks of Czechoslovakia
Tanks of Hungary
World War II medium tanks
Military vehicles introduced from 1940 to 1944
Tanks introduced in 1938